My Country's Wings is a 1939 Argentine film directed and written by Carlos F. Borcosque. The film stars Enrique Muiño, Pablo Palitos and Delia Garcés. The film is centered on the lives of men in Argentine Army Aviation.

Cast
Enrique Muiño
Pablo Palitos
Delia Garcés
Malisa Zini
Arturo Arcari
Daniel Belluscio
Alejandro Beltrami
Pedro Bibe
Miguel Coiro
Ada Cornaro
Pablo Cumo
César Fiaschi
Ricardo Grau
Lydia Lamaison
Salvador Lotito
Claudio Martino
Percival Murray
Oscar Valicelli

Release 
The film premiered on 3 June 1939.

References

External links
 

1939 films
1930s Spanish-language films
Argentine black-and-white films
Films directed by Carlos F. Borcosque
Aviation films
Argentine drama films
1939 drama films
1930s Argentine films